This is the list of stations of the Hyderabad Metro, a rapid transit system serving the city of Hyderabad in India. , there are 57 metro stations in the network, which were completed and operational as a part of Phase I making it the second longest operational metro network in India after Delhi Metro.

Prime Minister Narendra Modi inaugurated the Hyderabad Metro on 29 November 2017 by opening a 30 km stretch from Miyapur to Nagole and hence making it the longest stretch commissioned in the first phase among all metros in India. The system is operated by the Hyderabad Metro Rail Limited (HMRL). The signboards of Hyderabad Metro are displayed in Telugu, English, Hindi and Urdu at metro stations. All stations of Hyderabad Metro Rail are equipped with tactile pathway right from street level till the platform level along with elevator buttons equipped with Braille, for providing a barrier less navigation for the visually impaired commuters.

Each line of the Hyderabad Metro is identified by a specific colour. The system uses rolling stock of standard gauge and has the elevated lines. The Metro is open from about 06:30 to 22:30 hours with trains operating at a frequency of 3.5 to 6.5 minutes with SelTrac Communications-based train control (CBTC) and integrated telecommunication and supervision systems that allows an unattended train operation (UTO). , Hyderabad Metro has an average daily ridership of around 475,000 commuters. The Red Line connects Miyapur to the north and LB Nagar to the south, while the Blue Line connects HITEC City to the west and Nagole to the east.

Stations

Statistics

References

External links

 Hyderabad Metro Rail Ltd
 UrbanRail.Net – descriptions of all metro systems in the world, each with a schematic map showing all stations.

Hyderabad
Hyderabad, India-related lists